Ashish Suryawanshi (born 17 September 1990) was an Indian cricketer. He was a right-handed batsman and right-arm off-break bowler who played for Maharashtra. He was born in Latur.

Suryawanshi, who has played for the Under-15, Under-17, and Under-19 teams for Maharashtra, made his only Twenty20 appearance during the 2006-07 season, against Baroda, scoring 1 not out from the tailend, and conceding figures of 0-33 from four overs bowling.

Suryawanshi's only first-class appearance came the following season, against Tamil Nadu, against whom he scored 46 runs in the only innings in which he batted.

External links
Ashish Suryawanshi at Cricket Archive 

1990 births
Living people
Indian cricketers
Maharashtra cricketers